Molly Renshaw (born 6 May 1996) is an English breaststroke swimmer. In 2016, she won the 200 metres breaststroke at the 2016 FINA World Swimming Championships (25m).

Career
In 2012, she won the national 200 m title, but was not selected for the 2012 Olympics because her time was below the qualifying standard. She swam the qualifying time at the Olympic trials of March 2012, but did not win the race, which was required for the Olympic selection. Viewing setbacks as opportunities to identify and work on areas needing improvement, Molly Renshaw overcame the disappointment of not making the 2012 Olympic team. Recognizing areas where she needed support to reach the next level, Molly surrounded herself with a good team and coaches who pushed her, through the highs and lows of training and competition, to achieve her goals.

Renshaw made her British debut aged 15 at the 2011 World Championships in Shanghai, the first of five World Championships in which she reached five individual finals and one with the British women’s medley relay.

She competed at the 2016 Summer Olympics, setting a new British record of 2:22:33 while qualifying for the 200m breaststroke final.

Speaking from example, the 5-time World Championships competitor and 2016 World Champion, encourages younger swimmers to, “Be patient! You have to work hard to achieve your best, and it won’t come without going through highs and lows and being persistent with your training.”

In 2020 Renshaw competed for the US-based swim team - New York Breakers - in the second season of the International Swimming League.

Renshaw was named as a member of the British team to go to the postponed 2020 Olympics in 2021.

Renshaw was selected to compete for the New York Breakers again for the 2021 International Swimming League.

On 8th November 2022, Renshaw announced her retirement from the sport after an 11-year career.

References

External links
 
 
 
 
 
 

1996 births
Living people
Female breaststroke swimmers
English female swimmers
Sportspeople from Mansfield
Olympic swimmers of Great Britain
Swimmers at the 2016 Summer Olympics
Swimmers at the 2020 Summer Olympics
Medalists at the FINA World Swimming Championships (25 m)
European Aquatics Championships medalists in swimming
Swimmers at the 2014 Commonwealth Games
Swimmers at the 2018 Commonwealth Games
Swimmers at the 2022 Commonwealth Games
Commonwealth Games medallists in swimming
Commonwealth Games silver medallists for England
Commonwealth Games bronze medallists for England
Medallists at the 2014 Commonwealth Games
Medallists at the 2018 Commonwealth Games
Medallists at the 2022 Commonwealth Games